The Northern Ireland national football team represents Northern Ireland in international association football. It is organised by the Irish Football Association (IFA), which was formed in 1880, prior to the partition of Ireland. The original Ireland national team was selected by the IFA and included players from all of Ireland. Following the creation of the Irish Free State, the Football Association of Ireland (FAI) was set up and it picked its own national team. Until 1950, both Irish associations picked players from the whole of the island, which resulted in there being dual Irish international footballers. After complaints by the FAI against this practice being used by the IFA during 1950 FIFA World Cup qualification matches, FIFA decreed that each association should select teams based on their own part of Ireland.

Until the 1950s, the only major competition entered by Northern Ireland/Ireland was the British Home Championship, which operated until 1984. The team won the competition eight times, taking the title outright on three occasions, including the last championship in 1984. The best World Cup performance by Northern Ireland was in their first appearance in the finals, the 1958 World Cup, where they reached the quarter-finals after beating Czechoslovakia 2–1 in a play-off. Northern Ireland became the smallest country to have qualified for the World Cup, a record that stood until Trinidad & Tobago qualified for the 2006 World Cup.

Northern Ireland qualified for the 1982 World Cup. Gerry Armstrong scored the goal in a shock 1–0 win against tournament hosts Spain, which helped the team progress to the second group stage by winning their first group stage. Norman Whiteside became the youngest player ever in the World Cup finals, breaking a record set by Pelé. Northern Ireland also qualified for the 1986 World Cup, but did not progress beyond the first group stage. Billy Bingham, a playing member of the 1958 squad, was manager for both of these tournaments.

Northern Ireland qualified for the UEFA European Football Championship for the first time in 2016. They defeated West Germany 1–0 both home and away in UEFA Euro 1984 qualifying and David Healy set a record for goals scored in one European qualifying section, by scoring 13 times in UEFA Euro 2008 qualifying.

List of players

Key

References

External links
Northern Ireland's Footballing Greats

 
Association football player non-biographical articles